Hurtigruten AS is a Norwegian coastal ferry service and cruise line headquartered in Oslo, Norway. Together with Havila Kystruten (since 2021), it is one of two companies currently operating Hurtigruten, the coastal ferry service along the Norwegian coast from which it takes its name.

In 2020, 81% of the company was owned by TDR Capital. The CEO is Daniel Skjeldam.

History
Hurtigruten AS is the result of a merger between the two previous operators of the Hurtigruten service, Troms Fylkes Dampskibsselskap (TFDS) and Ofotens og Vesteraalens Dampskibsselskab (OVDS). TFDS was founded in 1866, and OVDS was established in 1868. The two companies merged in March 2006 to form Hurtigruten Group ASA, and twelve months later the merged entity assumed the name Hurtigruten ASA.

In 2012, the company headquarters was moved from Narvik to Tromsø. In October 2014, TDR Capital purchased a majority ownership of Hurtigruten.

In 2015, the legal form of Hurtigruten was changed from ASA to AS.

Operations

Coastal express service
Hurtigruten AS is the sole operator of the Hurtigruten (literally "The Fast Route"), a daily passenger ferry, cruise, and shipping line along the western and northern Norwegian coast. It operates between the southern Bergen and northeastern Kirkenes. A total of 11 ships operate the route.

Cruise ships
Several former Hurtigruten ships now operate as cruise ships to Antarctica, departing from Ushuaia on the Argentine Tierra del Fuego. The route can include the Falkland Islands and South Georgia Islands. Hurtigruten Group acquired the MS Fram for their tour cruises in Greenland.

Other cruises include touring: Iceland, the Mediterranean Region coasts and ports, and the 'Trans-Atlantic Voyage' from Las Palmas in the Canary Islands to Buenos Aires, Argentina.

Car ferries
Hurtigruten ASA operates a number of roll-on/roll-off car ferries in Nordland, Troms, Finnmark and Møre og Romsdal.

Tourism
The company owns a number of travel related companies, including the tour operator Spitsbergen Travel and a number of travel agencies in Norway and abroad.

The Hurtigruten Museum is a maritime museum about the 'Hurtigruten' that is located in the port city of Stokmarknes, Norway. The , retired from the coastal express and a museum ship now, is located on shore beside the Hurtigruten Museum.

Former assets

Buses
Hurtigruten ASA owned 71.3% of the transportation company TIRB. The shares were sold to Boreal Transport Nord AS in July 2014 for 95.9 million NOK.

Hotels
Hurtigruten AS owned two hotels in Bergen; Neptun Hotel and Strand Hotel. The hotels were sold to Bergen Hotel in 2008.

Current fleet
As of 2020, Hurtigruten AS operates 16 ships in its fleet:

References

External links

 official 'Hurtigruten website — in English.
 official 'Hurtigruten website — in Norwegian.

Ferry companies of Norway
Shipping companies of Norway
Cruise lines
Ferry companies of Nordland
Ferry companies of Troms og Finnmark
Companies based in Tromsø
Companies established in 1866
1866 establishments in Norway
Companies based in Narvik
Companies formerly listed on the Oslo Stock Exchange
Norwegian brands